Terri Doty is an American voice actress, voice director, and ADR writer known for her voice work in English dubs of Japanese anime shows produced by Funimation and Sentai Filmworks.

Career 
In anime, Doty is known for her work as Moriko Morioka in Recovery of an MMO Junkie, Kyoko Machi in Interviews with Monster Girls, Kirara Hazama from the Assassination Classroom series, and Chutaro Kumo in Laughing under the Clouds.

That Anime Show 

On January 16, 2010, Doty teamed up with J. Michael Tatum, and Stephen Hoff to start That Anime Show, a podcast that interviews fellow voice actors and members of the English anime dub industry. The podcast ran for 54 episodes with its final episode released on January 19, 2014.

Personal life
Doty was born in Philadelphia, Pennsylvania to a father of English descent and a mother of Mexican descent. She is married to voice director, producer, and audio engineer Stephen Hoff, who works for Christopher Sabat at the latter's studio, OkraTron5000. She is a former film student and is a fan of horror films. In 2017, Doty released a science fiction novel called One of Few.
Doty identifies as pansexual.

Filmography

Anime

Video games

Podcasts

Books
 One of Few (Perpetually Offbeat, 2017)

References

External links

That Anime Show

Living people
Actresses from Dallas
Actresses from Philadelphia
American podcasters
American video game actresses
American voice actresses
American voice directors
21st-century American actresses
Year of birth missing (living people)
Pansexual actresses
American LGBT actors
LGBT people from Texas
American women podcasters
LGBT people from Pennsylvania